Duck Creek is a stream in Stoddard County in the U.S. state of Missouri. It is a tributary of Upper Castor River.

Duck Creek was so named on account of ducks in the area.

See also
List of rivers of Missouri

References

Rivers of Stoddard County, Missouri
Rivers of Missouri